Santiago Pi (9 February 1930 – 28 April 1993) was a Spanish sailor. He competed in the Dragon event at the 1960 Summer Olympics.

References

External links
 

1930 births
1993 deaths
Spanish male sailors (sport)
Olympic sailors of Spain
Sailors at the 1960 Summer Olympics – Dragon
Sportspeople from Barcelona